Kirk DeMicco (born May 15, 1969) is an American filmmaker. He is best known for writing and directing Space Chimps, The Croods and Vivo.

Raised in Wyckoff, New Jersey and a former resident of Franklin Lakes, DeMicco attended Ramapo High School.

Journalism
After graduation in 1991 from the University of Southern California, where he double majored in economics and political science, he spent three years in Italy, where he worked as a journalist, interviewing individuals involved in the Italian movie industry for an Italian film-business magazine. After returning to the United States, he worked for the William Morris Agency in New York City, before relocating to the firm's office in Los Angeles in a transfer arranged by talent agent Lee Stollman.

Career 
DeMicco's first script sale was called "A Day in November" which he sold to Warner Bros. and producer Arnold Kopelson for $1 million before signing to write Quest for Camelot. Later he wrote and co-produced Racing Stripes for director Frederik Du Chau. John Cleese and DeMicco co-wrote the film adaptation of the Roald Dahl's children classic The Twits. He also wrote "Splitting Adam" a movie that was set up at United Artists. He then worked as a writer on Here Comes Peter Cottontail: The Movie and later worked on Casper's Scare School. While working at Warner Bros., he and Du Chau also wrote a script for the upcoming live-action–animated film based on the Hanna-Barbera character, Hong Kong Phooey, which they sold to Alcon Entertainment. He adapted the Jack Kirby comic New Gods, and collaborated with filmmaker Barry Sonnenfeld on an adaptation of an Elmore Leonard novel. He has also done many production rewrites for Disney, Warner Bros., DreamWorks and Spyglass. In television, he is the creator and executive producer of the Discovery Channel documentary HALO: Freefall Warriors.

Space Chimps 
In 2008, he wrote and directed the movie Space Chimps for John H. Williams and his company Vanguard Animation; the film is inspired by the first chimpanzee to go to space, Ham.

The Croods 

In 2013, DeMicco co-wrote and co-directed DreamWorks Animation's The Croods with Chris Sanders. DeMicco began writing the film with John Cleese in 2005. The Croods grossed over $582 million worldwide at the box office, and was nominated for the Academy Award for Best Animated Feature. It was also nominated for a Golden Globe. DeMicco and Sanders then worked on The Croods sequel for three and a half years, before its cancellation in late 2016, until it was revived a year later.

Vivo 

In December 2016, it was reported that DeMicco was directing Vivo for Sony Pictures Animation released on August 6, 2021. Lin-Manuel Miranda wrote new songs for this musical animated feature. Lin-Manuel Miranda reported that Vivo has been 10 years in the making and that it's in amazing shape. And that and Quiara [Alegría Hudes], my cowriter on [In the] Heights, is working on the screenplay with Kirk [De Micco], our director." In May of 2021, it was reported that Netflix has licensed all global rights, sans China, to Sony Pictures Animation’s Vivo. The movie, directed by Oscar nominee DeMicco, was written by DeMicco and Pulitzer Prize winner Quiara Alegría Hudes, who wrote the book for Miranda’s Tony-winning Broadway musical In the Heights. Said Miranda, “Bringing Vivo to life has been an incredible artistic journey. I couldn’t ask for better creative partners than Kirk, Quiara, Alex and the entire team at Sony Animation. I’m so excited Vivo will have a home at Netflix, where kids of all ages will be able to enjoy the film’s songs and adventures again and again.”

Ruby Gillman, Teenage Kraken 

In March 2023, DeMicco was announced as the director for Ruby Gillman, Teenage Kraken (replacing the film's original director Paul Tibbitt), scheduled for release on June 30, 2023.

Filmography
 Quest for Camelot (1998) (screenwriter)
 Racing Stripes (2005) (story writer, co-producer)
 Here Comes Peter Cottontail: The Movie (2005) (writer)
 Casper's Scare School (2006) (writer)
 Space Chimps (2008) (director, writer)
 The Croods (2013) (director, writer)
 The Star (2017) (Creative consultant)
 The Croods: A New Age (2020) (story writer)
 Vivo (2021) (director, screenwriter)
 Ruby Gillman, Teenage Kraken (2023) (director)

References

External links

1969 births
Living people
University of Southern California alumni
People from Franklin Lakes, New Jersey
People from Wyckoff, New Jersey
Ramapo High School (New Jersey) alumni
American male screenwriters
American animated film directors
DreamWorks Animation people
Film directors from New Jersey